Pan-American Para Table Tennis Championships is a quadrennial sports event for para table tennis players who represent a North, Central or South American country. It started in 1995, there was a six year break then in 2001, it became a biennial event, after 2005, it became a quadrennial event. This event occurs one year before the Parapan American Games as a qualifying tournament.

Locations

All-time medal count
As of 2001.

See also
Pan American Table Tennis Championships
Latin American Table Tennis Championships
North American Table Tennis Championships

References

Table tennis competitions
Para table tennis
Recurring sporting events established in 2001